Ivan Shariy (born 24 November 1957) is a former Soviet and Ukrainian footballer and Ukrainian football manager.

Biography
Native of Poltava, Shariy played football for almost a quarter of century. He started to play football at a local Poltava sports school. Viktor Nosov who at that time was a head coach of the Vorskla Poltava's predecessor Kolos invited Shariy to the team of masters that played at the Soviet Second League when Shariy just turned 16. Shariy debuted coming out as a substitute during the game against Avtomobilist (later better known as FC Polissya Zhytomyr). Soon he was noticed by scouts of the Soviet Top League from Dynamo Kyiv and CSKA Moscow and in 1976 joined the Kyivan team.

Due to strong competition for a spot on the main team and the reserve squad, Shariy soon left Dynamo in Kiev for another in Minsk that was coached by Oleh Bazylevych helping the main Belarusian team with promotion to the Soviet Top League. Following promotion of Dinamo Minsk, Shariy decided to stay and continue to play at the Soviet First League joining FC Metalurh Zaporizhia for which he scored a notable number of goals. After couple of seasons Shariy tried to return to Kiev and played for Dynamo of Valeriy Lobanovsky few games in the Soviet Cup, but later joined another Soviet Top League team, Chornomorets Odesa, that was coached by Nikita Simonyan. In Chornomorets Shariy spent the next six seasons. During his stay in Odessa Shariy continued to receive offers from PFC CSKA Moscow, particularly from Sergei Shaposhnikov.

Following Chornomorets, the Shariy's career took a dive and in late 1980s he played for lower tier clubs Nistru Kishinev and the recently revived Vorskla Poltava (in place of Kolos) from native Poltava. In 1990 Shariy left for Bulgaria where he played for Etar Veliko Tarnovo which placed third in the national top league that season. During that season he played alongside such players like Krasimir Balakov, Ilian Kiriakov, and Tsanko Tsvetanov. Soon after return from Bulgaria, Shariy continued to play for few seasons in lower tiers before the dissolution of the Soviet Union and in 1992 decided to retire from professional football.

After almost three year break in 1995 the Vorskla head coach Viktor Pozhechevskyi invited Shariy who was 39 years old to the club where he contributed to Vorskla's win of the Persha Liha (tier 2). After few seasons he returned to amateurs where he continued to play until around 2015.

Shariy also played couple of games at continental club competitions, the UEFA Cup, at first in the 1985–86 UEFA Cup for Chornomorets Odesa that represented the Soviet Union and hosted German Werder Bremen when he came out to substitute Igor Savelyev on the 66th minute. The second his game Shariy played on August 12, 1997 for FC Vorskla Poltava which represented Ukraine in away game against Belgian Anderlecht coming on as a substitute for Serhiy Chuichenko on the 83rd minute.

On 18 May 1999, Shariy set a record during the Ukrainian Premier League game against SC Mykolaiv for coming out on the field at the age of 41. The Ukrainian First League top scorer Serhiy Chuichenko considered Shariy to be the best footballer in history of Poltava football.

On 5 June 2009, he was appointed as an interim head coach of FC Poltava, while Shariy was to be assisted by Oleh Morhun. Shariy who until his appointed was a director of the Ivan Horpynko sports school in Poltava replaced the FC Poltava head coach Oleksandr Omelchuk.

Career statistics

Club

Notes

References

External links
 
 

1957 births
Living people
Sportspeople from Poltava
Soviet footballers
Ukrainian footballers
Association football forwards
FC Vorskla Poltava players
FC Dynamo Kyiv players
FC Dinamo Minsk players
FC Metalurh Zaporizhzhia players
FC Chornomorets Odesa players
FC Zimbru Chișinău players
FC Etar Veliko Tarnovo players
FC Nyva Vinnytsia players
FC Hirnyk-Sport Horishni Plavni players
FC Vorskla-2 Poltava players
FC Kremin Kremenchuk players
Ukrainian Premier League players
Soviet Top League players
First Professional Football League (Bulgaria) players
FC Vorskla-2 Poltava managers
FC Vorskla Poltava managers
FC Poltava managers
FC Spartak Sumy managers
Expatriate footballers in Bulgaria
Ukrainian expatriate footballers
Ukrainian football managers